No. 15 Group was a group in the British Royal Air Force operational in the last year of World War I, and throughout World War II.

World War I
No. 15 Group was first formed on 1 April 1918 as No. 15 (Equipment) Group in the No. 3 Area, which became the Midland Area on 8 May 1918. It was disbanded, and then reformed on 27 September 1918 as No. 15 (Aegean) Group to control 62 and 63 Wings, until finally disbanded on 1 September 1919.

World War II
The unit was reformed on 15 March 1939 as No. 15 (General Reconnaissance) Group as part of RAF Coastal Command. It comprised RAF Squadrons with attached Naval Air Squadrons of the Fleet Air Arm operating under RAF control. 15 Group was originally headquartered at Plymouth, with its squadrons flying patrols from bases in Cornwall, principally St Eval, until mid-1941. Its headquarters then transferred to Stranraer, with its squadrons flying from bases in Northern Ireland and western Scotland, to provide support and convoy escorts in the Western Approaches. It was disbanded on 1 August 1945 to join RAF Northern Ireland.

Squadrons

The following squadrons served as part of 15 Group for some time during World War II:

 No. 48 Squadron RAF
 No. 53 Squadron RAF
 No. 59 Squadron RAF
 No. 120 Squadron RAF
 No. 143 Squadron RAF
 No. 201 Squadron RAF
 No. 204 Squadron RAF
 No. 206 Squadron RAF
 No. 209 Squadron RAF
 No. 210 Squadron RAF
 No. 217 Squadron RAF
 No. 220 Squadron RAF
 No. 228 Squadron RAF
 No. 236 Squadron RAF
 No. 240 Squadron RAF
 No. 246 Squadron RAF
 No. 281 Squadron RAF
 No. 321 (Dutch) Squadron RAF
 No. 502 (Ulster) Squadron RAF
 No. 518 Squadron RAF
 No. 1402 (Meteorological) Flight RAF
 No. 10 Squadron RAAF
 No. 407 (Demon) Squadron RCAF
 No. 422 Squadron RCAF
 No. 423 Squadron RCAF

A number of Fleet Air Arm squadrons were also attached to 15 Group, usually on a short-term basis:

 829 Naval Air Squadron
 812 Naval Air Squadron
 816 Naval Air Squadron
 827 Naval Air Squadron
 890 Naval Air Squadron
 811 Naval Air Squadron
 825 Naval Air Squadron
 849 Naval Air Squadron
 838 Naval Air Squadron
 842 Naval Air Squadron

Commanding officers
 June 1939 – February 1941 : Air Commodore Rey Griffith Parry
 February 1941 – April 1942 : Air Vice-Marshal James Robb
 April 1942 – November 1942 : Air Vice-Marshal Douglas Colyer
 November 1942 – February 1943 : Air Vice-Marshal Thomas Langford-Sainsbury
 February 1943 – June 1945 : Air Vice-Marshal Leonard Slatter

References

 

015
015
Military units and formations established in 1918
Military units and formations of the Royal Air Force in World War I
Military units and formations disestablished in 1945